Antonio Barbaro (died 1679) was a Venetian general and governor, a member of the patrician Barbaro family of Venice (now Italy). Barbaro lived at a time when Venice had a maritime empire in the Mediterranean. He served in Candia (now Heraklion), Crete during the long-lasting Siege of Candia. He was Captain of the Gulf from 1655–56, and in 1667 he became Provveditore generale di Candia. He also served in the Balkans; from 1670 he became the provveditore generale of Venetian Dalmatia and Venetian Albania. When he died, he left 30 thousand "ducati" for the rebuilding of the church of Santa Maria Zobenigo in Venice.

Bibliography
 Decisione degli auditori nuovi alle sentenze di Venezia. 1693 maggio 28, Venezia Decisione di Antonio Barbaro, Benedetto Zorzi ed Alvise Gritti, auditori nuovi alle sentenze di Venezia sulla sentenza emessa da Alvise Priuli, capitano di Bergamo, a favore del marchese Gaspare Giacinto Martinengo fu Gherardo e contro la comunità di Calcinate, per l'elezione a canevaro, camparo e tesoriere del comune.
 Michaela Marangoni: Una famiglia veneziana nella storia: i Barbaro; atte del Convegno di Studi in Occasione del Quinto Centenario della Morte dell'Umanista Ermolao; Venezia, 4 - 6 novembre 1993. Venezia, 1996 
 A. Miculian: Copia dei Capitoli già stabiliti dall’ Ill. mo et ecc. mo Sig.r Antonio Barbaro Prov.re Gnal in Dalmatia, et Albania per gl’Haiduci

1679 deaths
Antonio
Year of birth unknown
Republic of Venice military personnel
Venetian governors
17th-century Italian military personnel